FC Kvant Obninsk is a Russian football team from Obninsk. It was founded in 1962 and played at amateur levels. It advanced to the third-tier FNL 2 for the first time ever for the 2018–19 season.

Current squad
As of 20 February 2023, according to the Second League website.

References

External links
Club history by FootballFacts

Association football clubs established in 1962
Football clubs in Russia
Sport in Kaluga Oblast
1962 establishments in Russia